Jack Whelan is Australian rules footballer.

Jack Whelan may also refer to:

Jack Whelan (pool player), winner of the IPA World Blackball Champion in 2015
Jack Whelan, character in Intruders (TV series)
Jack F. Whelan, survivor of a rare blood cancer who became a well-known advocate of cancer research

See also
John Whelan (disambiguation)